Czesław Ignacy Lorenc (14 April 1925 – 30 July 2015) was a Polish rower who competed in the 1952 Summer Olympics.

References

External links 
 
 
 
 

1925 births
2015 deaths
Polish male rowers
Olympic rowers of Poland
Rowers at the 1952 Summer Olympics
People from Jasło
Sportspeople from Podkarpackie Voivodeship